Noel Synnott (born 14 December 1951) is an Irish former football player and manager.

He was a defender who played for Shamrock Rovers and played three times for the Republic of Ireland national football team in 1978.

He began in the League of Ireland in 1973 playing for Sligo Rovers. He joined Shamrock Rovers the following year firstly playing under Mick Meagan, then Sean Thomas and Johnny Giles. He played for nine years at Milltown, making four appearances in European competition and a League of Ireland XI cap, plus 3 appearances against Liverpool FC and also against Southampton and for Waterford against Arsenal, he  also played for the League of Ireland against Argentina in April 1978, in the Boca Juniors stadium in Buenos Aires, just before Argentina won the world cup in June of that year. disaster struck on 27 March 1983 when he was the victim of a terribly crude tackle from Mick Fairclough of Dundalk which resulted in a broken leg.

Doctors told him he would never play again so a testimonial was held for him at Glenmalure Park on 21 September 1983.

However two years later he made a comeback for Waterford United where he scored an own goal in the FAI Cup Final in 1986 against Rovers. As Rovers had won the League again this final appearance had qualified the Blues for the UEFA Cup Winners' Cup where Noel scored against FC Girondins de Bordeaux in September 1986. Consequently, finishing top goalscorer for Waterford Utd. that year in European competition !

In August 1988 Synnott once again appeared in The Hoops in a Leinster Senior Cup (association football) tie.

After his playing career ended he served as manager of Kilkenny City F.C. for the 1991–92 season and Shamrock Rovers for a brief period in 2004.

He now works as a Taxi Driver specialising in driving members of the popular Leeds United forum WACCOE.com to their desired destination. Noel has gone on to star in a number of television advertisements.

Honours
 FAI Cup
 Shamrock Rovers 1978
 League of Ireland Cup
 Shamrock Rovers - 1976/77
 Leinster Senior Cup (football)
 Shamrock Rovers - 1982

Sources 
 The Hoops by Paul Doolan and Robert Goggins

References

1951 births
Living people
Republic of Ireland association footballers
Republic of Ireland international footballers
Association football defenders
League of Ireland players
Sligo Rovers F.C. players
Shamrock Rovers F.C. players
Waterford F.C. players
Shamrock Rovers F.C. managers
Republic of Ireland football managers
League of Ireland managers
League of Ireland XI players
British taxi drivers